The 2021–22 season was the 18th in the history of the Scarlets, a Welsh regional rugby union side based in Llanelli, Carmarthenshire. In this season, they competed in the inaugural United Rugby Championship and the Champions Cup. It was Dwayne Peel's first season as head coach of the region, following the departure of his predecessor Glenn Delaney.

Friendlies

United Rugby Championship

Fixtures

Table

Welsh Shield Table

European Rugby Champions Cup

Fixtures

Table

Statistics
(+ in the Apps column denotes substitute appearance, positions listed are the ones they have started a game in during the season)

Stats correct as of match played 21 May 2022

Transfers

In

Out

References 

Scarlets seasons
2021–22 United Rugby Championship by team
2021–22 in Welsh rugby union
2021–22 European Rugby Champions Cup by team